The Heaven Sword and Dragon Saber, also known as The Legend of Dragon Slayer Sword, is a Taiwanese television series adapted from Louis Cha's novel of the same title. The series was first broadcast on TTV in Taiwan in 1994. In this adaptation, the plot of the story is procrastinating, but the overall story is more complete, and the feelings of the play is more delicate and touching than other versions. It also corrected many unreasonable parts of the original story, and the ending of the plot is more in line with the plot of the original serial story.

Cast
 Steve Ma as Zhang Wuji / Zhang Cuishan
 Yeh Ching as young Zhang Cuishan
 Cecilia Yip as Zhao Min / Yin Susu
 Kathy Chow as Zhou Zhiruo
 Chin Ming as young Zhou Zhiruo
 Lau Dan as Xie Xun 
 Chang Feng as Zhang Sanfeng
 Chiang Ming as Song Yuanqiao
 Kang Kai as Yu Daiyan
 Hsiao Ta-lu as Yin Liting
 Joy Pan as Ji Xiaofu / Yang Buhui
 Huang Chung-yu as Cheng Kun
 Vicky Chen as Xiaozhao
 Yang Pao-wei as Yin Li
 Sun Xing as Yang Xiao
 Ku Pao-ming as Fan Yao
 Ku Feng as Yin Tianzheng
 Chang Chen-huan as Yin Yewang
 Chang Hai-lun as Golden Flower Granny
 Chang Ping-yu as Miejue
 Chang Kuang-hsi as Wei Yixiao
 Chao Shun as Zhou Dian
 Kuo Tzu-chien as Hu Qingniu
 Lang Tzu-yun as Wang Nangu
 Li Li-chun as Zhu Yuanzhang
 Chien Te-men as Ruyang Prince
 Cheng Ping-chun as Chen Youliang
 Hong Lin as Lu Zhangke
 Tsao Fu-kuo as He Biweng
 Li Li-ching as Ding Minjun
 Li Hsiao-chieh as Song Qingshu
 Chin Shih as Zhu Changling
 Kuang Ming-chieh as Zhu Jiuzhen
 Tan Hsiao-lan as Wu Qingying
 Feng Kuang-jung as Wei Bi
 Chu Pen-ke as Du Dajin

List of featured songs
 Suiyu Er'an (隨遇而安; Go With the Flow) performed by Wong Jim
 Daojian Rumeng (刀劍如夢;  A life of fighting is but a dream) performed by Wakin Chau
 Ai Jiangshan Geng Ai Meiren (愛江山更愛美人; I Love power , But I Love the Beauty Even More) performed by Lily Lee
 Shini Geiwo Yipian Tian (是你給我一片天; You Gave Me a Piece of Heaven) performed by Jackie Chan
 Liangliang Xiangwang (倆倆相忘; Forgetting Each Other) performed by Winnie Hsin

External links

1994 Taiwanese television series debuts
1994 Taiwanese television series endings
Taiwanese wuxia television series
Television shows based on The Heaven Sword and Dragon Saber
Television series set in the Yuan dynasty
Television series about orphans
1990s Taiwanese television series
Television shows about rebels
Television shows set on islands